Government Complex Gwacheon station is a station on the Gwacheon Line. It is the main station serving the city of Gwacheon.

Station layout

References

Seoul Metropolitan Subway stations
Railway stations opened in 1994
Metro stations in Gwacheon